The Milesiini (or Xylotini) is a large and diverse tribe of hoverflies. They mimic wasps or hornets.

List of genera 

Aneriophora Stuardo & Cortes, 1952
Blera Billberg, 1820
Brachypalpus Macquart, 1834
Caliprobola Rondani, 1845
Chalcosyrphus Curran, 1925
Criorhina Meigen, 1822
Cynorhinella Curran, 1922
Deineches Walker, 1852
Flukea Etcheverry, 1966
Hadromyia Williston, 1882
Hemixylota Shannon & Aubertin, 1933
Lejota Rondani, 1857
Lycastris Walker, 1857
Macrometopia Philippi, 1865
Macrozelima Stackelberg, 1930
Malometasternum Shannon, 1927
Matsumyia Shiraki, 1949
Meropidia Hippa & Thompson, 1983
Milesia Latreille, 1804
Nepenthosyrphus de Meijere, 1932
Odyneromyia Shannon & Aubertin, 1833
Orthoprosopa Macquart, 1850
Palumbia Rondani, 1865
Philippimyia Shannon, 1926
Pocota Lepeletier & Serville, 1828
Pterallastes Loew, 1863
Senogaster Macquart, 1834
Somula Macquart, 1847
Sphecomyia Latreille, 1829
Spilomyia Meigen, 1803
Sterphus Philippi, 1865
Stilbosoma Philippi, 1865
Syritta Lepeletier & Serville, 1828
Syrittosyrphus Hull, 1944
Takaomyia Herve-Bazin, 1914
Temnostoma Lepeletier & Serville, 1828
Teuchocnemis Osten Sacken, 1875
Tropidia Meigen, 1822
Valdiviomyia Vockeroth, 1976
Xylota Meigen, 1822

References 

Brachycera tribes
Eristalinae
Taxa named by Camillo Rondani